The Man at Midnight (German: Der Mann um Mitternacht) is a 1924 German silent film directed by Holger-Madsen and starring Hella Moja, Olaf Fjord and Henrik Malberg.

The film's sets were designed by Alfred Junge.

Cast
 Hella Moja as Elsa  
 Olaf Fjord as Helge Bjoernstad  
 Henrik Malberg as Knut Hammerdal  
 Holger-Madsen as Lighthouse keeper  
 Karl Etlinger as Ole  
 Claire Rommer as Ingrid  
 Erling Hanson as Sigurd Hoff  
 Adolphe Engers 
 Claus Hemmersbach as The lad

References

Bibliography
 Hans-Michael Bock and Tim Bergfelder. The Concise Cinegraph: An Encyclopedia of German Cinema. Berghahn Books.

External links

1924 films
Films of the Weimar Republic
Films directed by Holger-Madsen
German silent feature films
German black-and-white films